René Munk Thalund (born 20 November 1971) is the keyboard player in the Danish band Nephew.

In addition to his participation in Nephew, he has worked in the electronic genre. In the '90s, he worked with Carsten Heller and Jesper Birk to release electronic music under the name Shanks.dk. The trio were signed under the influential label of R&S Records in Belgium. Thalund was behind a remix of one of Nephew's own songs, creating the Nephew Nightlife Remix of Police Bells & Church Sirens, as well as "Allein Alene", Nephew's remix of "Allein Allein" by German band Polarkreis 18. and Nephew's remix of Bomb The Basss Time Falls Apart  In addition, he mixed songs for a number of Nephew's afterparties from autumn 2009 to spring 2010.

Thalund appeared in the live line-up with the Danish band Gangway for their reunion gigs in October 2017.

References

Danish musicians
1971 births
Living people
20th-century Danish musicians
21st-century Danish musicians